Nagorsky District is an administrative and municipal district (raion), one of the thirty-nine in Kirov Oblast, Russia. It is located in the north of the oblast. Its administrative center is the urban locality (an urban-type settlement) of Nagorsk. Population:  13,186 (2002 Census);  The population of Nagorsk accounts for 47.4% of the district's total population.

References

Notes

Sources

Districts of Kirov Oblast